Mumtaz Ansari  is an Indian politician. He was a Member of Parliament, representing Kodarma in the Lok Sabha, the lower house of India's Parliament, as a member of the Janata Dal.

References

External links
 Official biographical sketch in Parliament of India website

Lok Sabha members from Bihar
Janata Dal politicians
India MPs 1991–1996
1947 births
Living people